Varandarappilly is a panchayat   near Pudukkkad town  in Thrissur district, Kerala, India. It is located 22
 km from Thrissur City and 65 km from Kochi city. The Panchayath area is 102 km² and it has a population 27,343. Nandipulam, Mupliyam, Velupadam,  Palappilly, and Kallayi are nearby villages. Alagappa Nagar, Mattathur and Puthukkad are the neighbouring Panchayaths.

Schools
Daruthaqwa islamic academy pulikkanny 
Govt. High School, Kannattupadam
St. Joseph's High School, Velupadam
St. Pius Xth Convent UP School, Madam, Velupadam
A.L.P.School Velupadam
CJM Assumption High School, Pallikkunnu
CJM Assumption Higher Secondary School, Pallikkunnu
Janatha UP School, Varandarappilly
St. Antony's LP School, Varandappilly
St. John Bosco LP School, Varandarappilly
Gurudeva Public School, Varakkara
Govt. Higher Secondary School, Mupliyam
Vimal Jyothy Central School, Mupliyam
Vivekananda School
St. Antony's LP School, Varkkara
Lord's Academy ICSE School, Varandarapilly
B.B.L.P.S Manjoor
ICC Central School, Velupadam (Pound)
Mahmoodiyya Public School, Vettingappadam
Government Tribal School, Echippara
GUPS NANDIPULAM
Lourd Matha English Medium School Inchakundu

Madrasas
Daruthaqwa Islamic Academy 
Noorul Hudha Higher Secondary Madrassa, Pound
Shareeathul Muhammadiyya Madrassa, Palappilly
Hayathul Islam Madrassa, Pulikkanny

Temples
Sree Kandeswaram Kshethram, Varandarappilly
Paalakkal Kshethram, Varandarappilly
Trikkeyil Krishna Kshethram, Varandarappilly
Varakkara Sree Bhagavathi Kshethram, Varakkara
907 Sivakshethram, Karukulam, Kundayi Estate
Kizhakke Kumaranchira Bhagavathi Kshethram, Nandipulam
Payyur Kavu Kshethram, Nandipulam
Edathoott Shiva Kshethram, Nandipulam
Chemmandaparambil Kudumba Kshethram, Nandipulam
Kizhakkedath Bhagavathi Kshethram, Manjoor, Nandipulam
Mattil Sree Dharma Shasta Kshethram, Karayampadam
Madappilli Kaavu Kshethram, Mupliyam
Sree Vettiyattel Adiprashakthi Kshethram
Kunnath Baghavathy Kshethram, Rottipady
Kaniyamparambil Bhadrakali Kshethram, Thotumugham
Sree Durgadevi Kshetram, Punnassery Mana Varanda
Velupadam Bhagavathy Kshethram, Madam
Gannapathi Kshetram Munniyattukunnu

Churches
 Immaculate Heart Church, Varandrappilly
 Assumption Church, Pallikkunnu, Varandarappilly
 St. Joseph's Church, Velupadam
 Assumption Church, Mupliyam
 St. Antony's Church, Varakkara
 Lourd Matha Church, Inchakundu
 St. Mary's Chapel, Maiyamala

Mosques
 Juma Masjid, Pound
 Town Masjid, Varandarappilly
 Cheenikunnu Juma Masjid, Palappilly
 Masjid Aliyyibn Abi Thwalib, Pulikkanny
 Masjidul Ijaba, Daruthaqwa, Pulikkanny

References

Cities and towns in Thrissur district
Villages in Mukundapuram Taluk